The 2005 Men's World Water Polo Championship was the eleventh edition of the men's water polo tournament at the World Aquatics Championships, organised by the world governing body in aquatics, the FINA. The tournament was held in a temporary pool on Île Sainte-Hélène from 18 to 30 July 2005, and was incorporated into the 2005 World Aquatics Championships in Montréal, Canada.

Qualification

Participating teams

Groups formed

Group A
 
 
 
 

Group B
 
 
 
 

Group C
 
 
 
 

Group D

Preliminary round

Group A

 Monday July 18, 2005

 Wednesday July 20, 2005

 Friday July 22, 2005

Group B

 Monday July 18, 2005

 Wednesday July 20, 2005

 Friday July 22, 2005

Group C

 Monday July 18, 2005

 Wednesday July 20, 2005

 Friday July 22, 2005

Group D

 Monday July 18, 2005

 Wednesday July 20, 2005

 Friday July 22, 2005

Knockout stage

Final round

Finals

5th-8th place

9th-12th place

13th-16th place

Playoff round
 Sunday July 24, 2005

Classification round
 Sunday July 24, 2005 — 13th/16th place

 Tuesday July 26, 2005 — 9th/12th place

 Thursday July 28, 2005 — 5th/8th place

Quarter finals
 Tuesday July 26, 2005

Semi finals
 Thursday July 28, 2005

Finals
 Tuesday July 26, 2005 — 15th place

 Tuesday July 26, 2005 — 13th place

 Thursday July 28, 2005 — 11th place

 Thursday July 28, 2005 — 9th place

 Saturday July 30, 2005 — 7th place

 Saturday July 30, 2005 — 5th place

 Saturday July 30, 2005 —  Bronze-medal match

 Saturday July 30, 2005 —  Gold-medal match

Final ranking

Medalists

Individual awards

 Most Valuable Player
 

 Best Goalkeeper
 

 Topscorer
  — 26 goals

References

External links
 11th FINA World Championships 2005 FINA Water Polo website 
 Omega Timing
 Men Water Polo World Championship 2005 Montreal www.todor66.com

Men's tournament
2005